Harald Morscher (born 22 June 1972 in Hohenems) is an Austrian former professional cyclist. He competed in the men's individual road race at the 1996 Summer Olympics. He also won the Austrian National Road Race Championships in 2004.

Major results

1994
 1st Overall Tour of Austria
1st Stage 2
1997
 2nd Road race, National Road Championships
2000
 1st Stage 5 3-Länder-Tour
 1st Stage 3 Tour du Poitou-Charentes
2001
 1st Stage 6 Tour de Normandie
 1st Stage 6 Tour of Austria
2005
 1st GP Innsbruck
2006
 2nd Road race, National Road Championships

References

External links

1972 births
Living people
Austrian male cyclists
Olympic cyclists of Austria
Cyclists at the 1996 Summer Olympics
People from Hohenems
Sportspeople from Vorarlberg
20th-century Austrian people